The 68th San Sebastián International Film Festival took place from 18 to 26 September 2020 in San Sebastián, Gipuzkoa, Spain. The festival opened with Woody Allen's Rifkin's Festival. Viggo Mortensen was awarded the Donostia Award for lifetime achievements.

The competitive awards were presented on 26 September 2020. Beginning by Dea Kulumbegashvili swept the official selection prizes, winning the Golden Shell, as well as Best Actress, Screenplay, and Director. Another Round ensemble lead cast won the Silver Shell for Best Actor.

Background 
In June 2020, American actor Viggo Mortensen was announced as recipient of a Donostia Award.
Other than the announcement of the opener (Rifkin's Festival, out of competition), the first films confirmed to be in for screening were official selection competitive titles Another Round, True Mothers, Summer of 85, In the Dusk, Beginning, and Any Crybabies Around?. The festival picked up 17 works (13 feature films and 4 short films) that have been pre-selected for the 2020 Cannes Film Festival, cancelled due to the COVID-19 pandemic in France. Cannes Festival director Thierry Fremaux participated in the Zinemaldia's opening gala on 18 September, making together with José Luis Rebordinos a plea for the return of people to the theatres.

Juries 
Official Selection
 Luca Guadagnino (President)
 Joe Alwyn
 Marisa Fernández Armenteros
 Michel Franco
 Lena Mossum

Sections

Official Selection 
In competition
The lineup of films selected for the Official Selection is as follows:
Highlighted title indicates award winner.

Out of competition
The following works were selected to screen out of competition:

Latin Horizons 
The following films were selected for the Latin Horizons section:
Highlighted title indicates award winner.

New Directors 
The following films were selected for the New Directors section:
Highlighted title indicates award winner.

Zabaltegi-Tabakalera 
The following films were selected for the Zabaltegi-Tabakalera section:
Highlighted title indicates award winner.

Official Selection Awards 
 Golden Shell: Beginning by Dea Kulumbegashvili
 Special Jury Prize: Crock of Gold: A Few Rounds with Shane MacGowan by Julian Temple
 Silver Shell for Best Director: Dea Kulumbegashvili (Beginning)
 Silver Shell for Best Actress: Ia Sukhitashvili (Beginning)
 Silver Shell for Best Actor: Mads Mikkelsen, Thomas Bo Larsen, Magnus Millang, Lars Ranthe (Another Round)
 Best Screenplay: Dea Kulumbegashvili and Rati Oneli (Beginning)
 Best Cinematography: Yuta Tsukinaga (Any Crybabies Around?)

References 

September 2020 events in Spain
San Sebastián International Film Festival
2020 in the Basque Country (autonomous community)
San Sebastian